Continental, a Film Without Guns is a 2007 Canadian comedy-drama film directed and written by Stéphane Lafleur.

Plot 
The lives of four people intertwine after the disappearance of a man who wanders into the forest. A Man wakes up on a bus. Everybody is gone. Night has fallen. He gets off the bus and finds himself at the edge of a forest. Sounds are coming from deep within the woods. The Man enters the forest and disappears into the night.

Recognition 

 Won: 2007 Toronto International Film Festival: Best Canadian First Feature Film
 Won: 2007 Whistler Film Festival: Borsos Competition Best Canadian Film
 Official Selection: Venice Film Festival
Jutra Awards:
 Best Motion Picture of the Year (Meilleur Film) - Luc DéryKim McCraw
 Best Achievement in Directing (Meilleure Réalisation) - Stéphane Lafleur
 Best Performance by an Actor in a Supporting Role (Meilleur Acteur de Soutien) - Réal Bossé
 Best Screenplay (Meilleur Scénario) - Stéphane Lafleur
 Nominee:
Genie Award for Best Motion Picture - Luc DéryKim McCraw
Genie Award for Best Achievement in Art Direction/Production Design - André-Line Beauparlant
Genie Award for Best Performance by an Actor in a Supporting Role - Gilbert Sicotte
Genie Award for Best Performance by an Actress in a Supporting Role - Marie-Ginette Guay
Genie Award for Best Performance by an Actress in a Supporting Role - Fanny Mallette
Jutra Awards:
 Best Achievement in Cinematography (Meilleure Direction de la Photographie) - Sara Mishara
 Best Achievement in Art Direction (Meilleure Direction Artistique) - André-Line Beauparlant
 Best Achievement in Editing (Meilleure Montage) - Sophie Leblond
 Best Achievement in Sound (Meilleur Son) - Pierre Bertrand, Sylvain Bellemare and Bernard Gariépy Strobl

References

External links 
 
 

2007 films
2000s French-language films
2007 comedy-drama films
Films directed by Stéphane Lafleur
Canadian comedy-drama films
Best Film Prix Iris winners
French-language Canadian films
2000s Canadian films